Anna Morichelli Bosello (1745–1800) was an Italian soprano, known for her rivalry with Brigida Banti.

Life

Italy 
Anna Morichelli was born at Reggio in 1760. Being endowed by nature with a pure and flexible voice, she was instructed by Gaetano Guadagni, one of the best sopranists of the day. She made her début at Parma in 1779 with great éclat. After singing at Venice and Milan, she appeared at Vienna in 1781–2, and with difficulty obtained leave from the Emperor to return and fulfil an engagement at Turin.

Paris 
She continued to sing at the chief theatres of Italy, until Giovanni Battista Viotti engaged her for the Théâtre de Monsieur, at Paris, in 1790, where she remained during the years 1791–2. Here she was very highly appreciated, even by such good judges as Pierre Garat.

London 
With this reputation she came to London in 1792, with Brigida Banti. Lorenzo d'Aponte, the poet of the London Opera-House, gives a severe description of these two singers in his Memoirs: he calls them 'equals in vice, passions, and dishonesty', though differing in the methods by which they sought to accomplish their designs:

To musical amateurs, such as Lord Mount-Edgcumbe, Morichelli seemed far below her rival:

Decline 
Morichelli returned to Italy in 1794, and soon after retired from the stage.

See also 

 La capricciosa corretta

References

Sources

English 

 Da Ponte, Lorenzo (1959). Memoirs of Lorenzo Da Ponte. Abbott, Elisabeth (trans.). Livingston, Arthur (ed.). New York, NY: Orion Press. pp. 126–130.
 Libby, Denis, and Link, Dorothea (2002). "Morichelli [Bosello], Anna". Grove Music Online. Oxford University Press.
 Marshall, Julian (1900). "Morichelli, Anna". In Grove, George (ed.). A Dictionary of Music and Musicians. Vol. 2. London: Macmillan & Co., Limited. pp. 365–366. 
 Russo, Joseph Louis (1922). Lorenzo Da Ponte: Poet and Adventurer. New York, NY: Columbia University Press. pp. 89–91.

Italian 

 Bustico, Guido (1922). Il teatro antico di Novara (1695–1873). Novara: «La Tipografica» – Soc. Anon. Coop. p. 33
 Caprioli, Leonella Grasso (2012). "Morichelli, Anna". Dizionario Biografico degli Italiani. Vol. 76. Treccani.it.
 Chiappori, Giuseppe (1818). Serie cronologica delle rappresentazioni drammaticopantomimiche poste sulle scene dei principali teatri di Milano dall'autunno 1776 all'intero autunno 1818. Milan: Giovanni Silvestri. pp. 23, 28, 29, 36, 37, 124, 231, 241.
 Gervasoni, Carlo (1812). Nuova teoria di musica ricavata dall'odierna pratica, ossia Metodo sicuro e facile in pratica per ben apprendere la musica, a cui si fanno precedere varie notizie storico-musicali. Parma: Blanchon. pp. 191–192.
 Pasolini-Zanelli, G. (1888). Il teatro di Faenza: dal 1788 al 1888. Faenza: Pietro Conti. pp. 24–32, 103.
 Wiel, Taddeo (1897). I teatri musicali veneziani del settecento. Catalogo delle opere in musica rappresentate nel secolo XVIII in Venezia (1701–1800). Venice: Fratelli Visentini. pp. lxvii, 350, 356, 357, 358, 368, 466, 467, 473, 474, 481, 482, 486, 494, 559, 572.
 La disfatta de' Mori; dramma per musica, da rappresentarsi nel Regio Teatro di Torino, nel carnovale del 1791. Torino: Onorato Derossi, 1791. p. v.

1745 births
1800 deaths
Italian sopranos